El Junco Lagoon is a lake in the highlands of San Cristóbal Island in the Galápagos Islands. Despite the name, it is a volcanic crater lake rather than a lagoon.

History
El Junco inhabits a crater formed by the collapsed caldera of a volcano. Research has indicated the lake to have been extant since the end of the last ice age. The name El Junco is Spanish for sedge which is endemic to the islands.

During World War II, American forces stationed at the military base on Baltra Island utilized El Junco as a primary source of water, due to it being the closest available source of freshwater.

The lake is managed by the Galapagos National Park Service.

Flooding
Due to the lake's lack of a permanent outflow, heavy rains can cause the lake to breach its banks. Several flood incidents, often corresponding to El Nino, have been recorded. Similar events in 1978 and 1998 caused serious damage to the nearby Puerto Baquerizo Park.

Ecology

Flora
The name El Junco is a reference to the endemic sedge (Cyperus anderssonii) which can be found growing close to the lake. Additionally, the endangered Galapagos miconia (Miconia robinsoniana) can be found in the highlands surrounding the lake. Only two populations are known to occur in the wild, the other being in the highlands of nearby Santa Cruz island.

Fauna
Many species of birds inhabit the lake area including the endemic San Cristóbal mockingbird and white-cheeked pintail. Due to its status as an isolated source of fresh water, it is also one of the few places to witness frigatebirds preening their feathers.

Research
Using radiocarbon dating, it has been found that  of the top layer were deposited during the last 10,000 years, with the remaining  deposited during periods of drought over the course of 38,000 years, giving a total sediment age of 48,000 years.

It is believed that the climate of the Galapagos went through a dry period caused by glacial advances in the Northern Hemisphere, beginning 48,000 years ago and ending 10,000 years ago.

References

Volcanic crater lakes
Galápagos Islands
San Cristóbal Province
Lakes of Ecuador